is a Japanese manga series written and illustrated by Shin Takahashi. It was serialized in Kodansha's seinen manga magazine Weekly Young Magazine from July 2011 to May 2013, with its chapters collected in eight tankōbon volumes. A sequel, titled Yuki ni Tsubasa: Haru, was serialized in the same magazine from May 2013 to February 2015, with its chapters collected in eight tankōbon volumes.

Publication
Written and illustrated by Shin Takahashi, Kanata-Kakeru was serialized in Kodansha's seinen manga magazine Weekly Young Magazine from July 16, 2011, to May 13, 2013. Kodansha collected its chapters in eight tankōbon volumes, released from December 6, 2011, to December 20, 2013.

A sequel to the manga, titled , was serialized in the same magazine from May 27, 2013, to February 2, 2015. Kodansha collected its chapters in eight tankōbon volumes, released from May 2, 2014, to October 6, 2015.

Volume list

Yuki ni Tsubasa

Yuki ni Tsubasa: Haru

References

External links
 

Fantasy anime and manga
Kodansha manga
Romance anime and manga
Seinen manga